José Eduardo Gandra da Silva Martins, born 1938, is a Brazilian concert pianist.

Career 
He began his career with a performance at the Colombo Theater in São Paulo on December 10, 1954, which included contemporary works by Dmitri Shostakovich.

Martins was Professor at the university of São Paulo between 1982-2007.

He recorded several albums with compositions by Henrique Oswald, including his cello sonatas No. 1 and No. 2, Piano Quartet No. 2 and Piano Quintet.

He commissioned works from the composer Gilberto Mendes including Um Estudo? Eisler e Webern Caminham nos Mares do Sul.

Honours 
 Officer in the Order of the Crown, by royal decree of King Albert II.
 Doctor Honoris Causa University Constantin Brâncuşi 
 Order of Rio Branco

References

External links 
 Official website

Officers of the Order of the Crown (Belgium)
Academic staff of the University of São Paulo
1938 births
Living people
Brazilian classical pianists